Catherine R. Kinney was President of the New York Stock Exchange from 2002-08.Catherine R. Kinney , Forbes, Retrieved February 17, 2011

Biography
Mrs. Kinney joined the NYSE in 1974 and rose through the ranks, holding management positions in several divisions, including Technology Planning, Sales and Marketing, and Regulation.

Mrs. Kinney graduated magna cum laude from Iona College and attended the thirteen-week Advanced Management Program, Harvard Business School.   She has received honorary degrees from Georgetown University and Rosemont College.

References

Presidents of the New York Stock Exchange
Iona University alumni
Living people
Year of birth missing (living people)